Devereaux is a variation of the surname Devereux based on the common English pronunciation "Devero". Notable people with the surname include:

 Boyd Devereaux (born 1978), Canadian hockey player
 Ed Devereaux (1925–2003), Australian actor
 James P.S. Devereaux, American military officer and U.S. Congressman
 Jarboe La Salle Devereaux, American experimental musician
 Maurice Devereaux, Canadian director
 Mike Devereaux (born 1963), American baseball player
 Yvette Devereaux, American conductor
 Stacie Devereaux (born 1986), curler from St. John's, Newfoundland and Labrador.
 Tricia Devereaux (born 1975), American former pornographic actress
 Minnie Devereaux (1891–1984), Canadian silent film actress nicknamed "Indian Minnie" and "Minnie Ha-ha"

People with the given name Devereaux include:
 Devereaux Mytton (1924–1989), Australian competitive sailor and Olympic medalist
 Devereaux Peters (born 1989), American basketball player
Fictional people:
 Blanche Devereaux, character on The Golden Girls
 Clark "Mouth" Devereaux, character on The Goonies
 Earl Devereaux, character in Cloudy with a Chance of Meatballs and Cloudy with a Chance of Meatballs 2
 Candace Devereaux, co-owner and operator of the Women & Women First bookstore on Portlandia
 Jonathan Devereaux Double Jeopardy
 Major General William Devereaux on The Siege.
 Ben & Violet Devereaux The Skeleton Key
 Devereaux sisters, from the Dark-Hunter paranormal romance series
 Matt Devereaux, played by Spencer Tracy as patriarch of the Devereaux family in the 1954 film, Broken Lance
 Nicholas Devereaux, Princess Mia's lover in Princess Diaries 2
 Peter Devereaux, main protagonist in the 2014 film The November Man
 Rupert Devereaux, fictional British Prime Minister in the Bartimaeus Trilogy
 Sophie Devereaux, character on Leverage
 Sophie Devereaux, Jane-Anne Devereaux and Monique Devereaux, characters on The Originals
 Father Tim Devereaux, character on Irish television series Glenroe

See also
 Devereaux, New Brunswick
 Devereaux Elementary School
 Harley Ellis Devereaux, American architectural firm
 Yoko Devereaux, clothing brand
 Deveaux
 Deveraux

Surnames of Norman origin